Margo Johns (4 September 1919 – 29 September 2009) was a British actress and the first wife of actor William Franklyn, and mother of actress Sabina Franklyn.

Her film credits include Murder at the Windmill (1949), Konga (1961) and This Is My Street (1964), while her television credits include Dixon of Dock Green, Dangerman (1964), Emergency - Ward 10, The Saint and Yes Minister.

References

External links

1919 births
2009 deaths
English film actresses
English television actresses